The Gleneagles Hotel Foursomes Tournament was a pro-am golf tournament played at the Gleneagles Hotel, Auchterarder, Perthshire, Scotland. The event was held annually from 1953 to 1966. From 1953 to 1957 it was called the Gleneagles-Saxone Foursomes Tournament. Saxone was a Scottish footwear manufacturer.

Detail
In 1953, 32 professionals were invited who each chose their own amateur partner. The event was played under handicap with the professionals playing off scratch and the amateurs limited to a handicap of 6. Play was over four days with two round played on the third day. The final and 3rd/4th place match were over 18 holes on the fourth day. Total prize money was £3,000.

The 1954 event was severally affected by rain. The first day's play was lost and the first round was played at Carnoustie Golf Links on the second day. The players returned to Gleneagles, where the second and third round were played o the third day and the semi-final and final on the final day. There was a consolation event for those pairs beaten in the first round.

The 1955 event was reduced to three days, using the format used in 1954.

Winners

References

Golf tournaments in Scotland
Defunct golf tournaments
Sport in Perth and Kinross
Recurring sporting events established in 1953
Recurring sporting events disestablished in 1966
1953 establishments in Scotland
1966 disestablishments in Scotland